Miss International Queen 2009, the fifth Miss International Queen pageant, was held on October 31, 2009, at Pattaya City in Thailand. Tanyarat Jirapatpakon of Thailand crowned her successor, Ai Haruna of Japan at the end of the event.

Result

Special Awards

Contestants

References

External links 
 

2009 beauty pageants
2009
Beauty pageants in Thailand